Friends Burial Ground is a historic Quaker cemetery in Baltimore, Maryland, United States. It contains a total of approximately 1,900 small, simple grave markers, arranged in compact rows interspersed with large trees.

Friends Burial Ground was added to the National Register of Historic Places in 2005.

References

External links

 , including photo dated 2002, Maryland Historical Trust
 

Coldstream-Homestead-Montebello, Baltimore
Properties of religious function on the National Register of Historic Places in Baltimore
Cemeteries in Baltimore
Christianity in Baltimore
Quaker cemeteries
Quakerism in Maryland
Baltimore City Landmarks